Friedericke Buchegger is an Austrian Righteous Among the Nations.

She was deeply involved in the rescue of the Czech Jew Walter Posiles and his brothers Hans and Ludwig, shortly before they were deported to the concentration camp Theresienstadt.

Walter Posiles and the Viennese woman Edeltrud Becher had been reported because of miscegenation. Because of her connections to a member of the Vienna police, Friedericke Buchegger was able to obtain the destruction of the incriminating record. Nevertheless, the brothers had to stay underground.

In 1942, Friedericke took Walter's brother Ludwig in and hid him. In August 1942, Walter suffered greatly from pneumonia and pleurisy. Friedericke found the medical practitioner Dr. Ernst Pick, who was inclined to treat the critically ill Walter without sending him to hospital.

External links
 Friedericke Buchegger – her activity to save Jews' lives during the Holocaust, at Yad Vashem website
 https://web.archive.org/web/20110609152631/http://www.gedenkdienst.org/deutsch/gerechte/inhalt.php (German)

20th-century Austrian women
Austrian Righteous Among the Nations
People from Vienna
Possibly living people
Year of birth missing